Rhytidoporus indentatus is a species of burrowing bug in the family Cydnidae. It is found in the Caribbean, North America, and Oceania.

References

External links

 

Cydnidae
Articles created by Qbugbot
Insects described in 1877